The Ernest Guenther Award in the Chemistry of Natural Products is an American Chemical Society (ACS) award in the field of the chemistry of natural products. The purpose of the award is to recognize and encourage outstanding achievements in the analysis, structure elucidation, and chemical synthesis of natural products, with special consideration given to the independence of thought and originality. The award is granted regardless of race, gender, age, religion, ethnicity, nationality, sexual orientation, gender expression, gender identity, presence of disabilities, and educational background. The award consists of $6,000, a medallion, and a certificate. The medallion is presented during an award address.

The award was established in 1948 by Fritzsche Dodge and Olcott Inc. to mark the 75th anniversary of the founding of the company. Since 1969, the award has been named for their former leader, Ernest Guenther, who wrote numerous works on essential oils. Givaudan acquired Fritzsche Dodge and Olcott in 1990. Since 1992 the award has been supported by Givaudan.

Recipients 
Winners of the Nobel Prize are marked with the year of the award in parentheses.

See also

 List of chemistry awards

External links 
 Ernest Guenther Award in the Chemistry of Natural Products sponsored by the American Chemical Society

References

Awards of the American Chemical Society
Awards established in 1949